Daniel T. Lilley (August 15, 1920 – June 1996) was an American politician. He served as a Democratic member of the North Carolina House of Representatives.

Life and career 
Lilley was born in Martin County, North Carolina. He attended Farm Life High School and Spartan School of Aeronautics.

In 1969, Lilley was elected to the North Carolina House of Representatives.

Lilley died in June 1996, at the age of 75.

References 

1920 births
1996 deaths
People from Martin County, North Carolina
Democratic Party members of the North Carolina House of Representatives
20th-century American politicians